Ollie Smith (born 7 August 2000) is a Scotland international rugby union player for Glasgow Warriors in the United Rugby Championship. Smith's primary position is full back but can also play at centre. Ollie Smith is the great-great-great-great-grandson of Eric Milroy's grandfather, whose family originally farmed near Stoneykirk in Wigtownshire, Scotland. Eric Milroy was a War hero of 1914–1918. Smith's link to Scottish rugby war hero. The name of Eric Milroy and Marcel Burgun are inscribed on the Auld Alliance Trophy contested by France and Scotland since 2018 in the 6 nations tournament.

Rugby Union career

Amateur career

Smith first played youth rugby with Marr.  He then moved to play for Ayr.

Smith was a member of the winning Strathallan School team that won the 2017-18 Scottish Rugby Schools' Cup 52–8 against Glenalmond College at Murrayfield.

Professional career

He played for the Ayrshire Bulls in the Super 6 in 2019–20 season.

Smith was named as a member of the Glasgow Warriors academy for the 2020–21 season. He made his debut for Glasgow Warriors in the re-arranged Round 9 of the 2020–21 Pro14 against . He is Warrior No. 321.

On 24 February 2021 it was announced that Smith had graduated from the academy to sign with Glasgow Warriors.

International career

In February 2022 Smith was called up to the Scotland squad for the 2022 Six Nations Championship.

He was capped by Scotland 'A' on 25 June 2022 in their match against Chile. He received his first full international cap for Scotland in the 3rd test against Argentina in Santiago del Estero on 16 July 2022.

References

External links

https://www.thetimes.co.uk/article/ollie-smith-continues-legacy-of-scottish-rugby-war-hero-vvs5tssqw

2000 births
Living people
Glasgow Warriors players
Rugby union centres
Ayr RFC players
Marr RFC players
People educated at Strathallan School
Scottish rugby union players
Scotland 'A' international rugby union players
Scotland international rugby union players
People from Prestwick
Rugby union players from South Ayrshire